Czewoja II is a Polish coat of arms. It was used by several szlachta families in the times of the Kingdom of Poland and the Polish–Lithuanian Commonwealth. A variant of the Czewoja coat of arms.

History

The Czewoja II was used mainly in the Krakow and Sandomierz area by around 10 families.

Blazon

Notable bearers

Notable bearers of this coat of arms include:

See also
 Polish heraldry
 Heraldic family
 List of Polish nobility coats of arms

Bibliography
 Tadeusz Gajl: Herbarz polski od średniowiecza do XX wieku : ponad 4500 herbów szlacheckich 37 tysięcy nazwisk 55 tysięcy rodów. L&L, 2007. .

References

Azewoja